Thomas Holland, 1st Duke of Surrey, 3rd Earl of Kent, KG, Earl Marshal (8 September 1372 – 7 January 1400) was an English nobleman and courtier.

Early life and family

Born on 8 September 1372, Thomas Holland was the eldest son and heir of Thomas Holland, 2nd Earl of Kent (1350–1397), and Alice FitzAlan, daughter of Richard FitzAlan, 3rd Earl of Arundel. His father was a maternal half-brother of King Richard II, and the younger Thomas had two brothers and six sisters.

Shortly after 20 October 1392, Thomas Holland married Joan Stafford, daughter of Hugh, Earl of Stafford. They had no children. In 1394 he and his father accompanied the king to Ireland.

On his father's death in 1397 he succeeded him as 3rd Earl of Kent and 4th Baron Holland. At that time Kent's uncle King Richard II was removing the Duke of Gloucester and his associates from power, and sent Kent to arrest his own uncle, the Earl of Arundel. In reward he received a share of the forfeited estates, and on 29 September 1397 was created Duke of Surrey. Another uncle, the Earl of Huntingdon, was created Duke of Exeter on that day as well. In 1398 he founded Mount Grace Priory in Yorkshire.

Last years and execution

Surrey, along with many of King Richard II's advisors, was arrested after the King's deposition by King Henry IV in 1399. In the end he had to forfeit the honours and estates he had gained after the arrests of Gloucester and Arundel, in particular the Dukedom of Surrey, although he retained the Earldom of Kent.

Early in 1400, Kent, along with his uncle, the Earl of Huntingdon (no longer Duke of Exeter), plotted to kill King Henry IV and free King Richard II from prison and return him to the throne. This "Epiphany Rising" failed and Kent was captured and executed.

He was succeeded as Earl of Kent by his brother Edmund.

Ancestry

References

External links
 Dukes of Exeter and Surrey − Harley MS 1319 fol. 25
 Online fragment of 
 Thomas Holand

1372 births
1400 deaths
Earls Marshal
Knights of the Garter
People executed under the Lancastrians
Executed people from Northamptonshire
Dukes in the Peerage of England
People from Fotheringhay
People executed under the Plantagenets for treason against England
Male Shakespearean characters
Thomas
Earls of Kent (1360 creation)
7
Lords Lieutenant of Ireland